A caldera is a volcanic feature formed by the collapse of land following a volcanic eruption.

Caldera may also refer to:

People 
 Henry Caldera (1937–2007), Sri Lankan singer, songwriter, and musician
 Henry Caldera (football manager) (born 1959), Curaçao professional football manager
 Jorge Herrera Caldera (born 1963), Mexican politician and Governor of Durango
 Junior Caldera, French disc jockey 
 Louis Caldera (born 1956), former U.S. Secretary of the Army 
 Marcelo Alberto Bielsa Caldera (born 1955), Argentine football manager 
 María Lourdes Caldera (born 1983), Venezuelan pageant titleholder
 Miguel Caldera (1548–1597), figure in the Spanish conquest of the Aztec Empire of Mexico
 Rafael Caldera (1916–2009), 56th and 60th President of Venezuela
 Rafael Antonio Bielsa Caldera (born 1953), Argentine Justicialist Party politician
 Renzo Caldera (or Caldara), Italian bobsledder

Places 
 Argentina
 La Caldera, small town and municipality in Salta Province

 Chile
 Caldera, Chile, a port city
Caldera Basin, a sedimentary basin in northern Chile 

 Costa Rica
 Caldera Port, the freight port of the city of Puntarenas.

 Panama
Caldera, Chiriquí, Panama

Arts and entertainment 
 Caldera (band)
 Caldera (film)
 Caldera, a city in the video game Red Steel 2
 Caldera, a city in the video game The Elder Scrolls III: Morrowind
 Caldera, an island in the video game Call of Duty: Warzone
 Caldera, a town/fortress in the video game Risen 2: Dark Waters
 Caldera (album)
 Dr. Caldera, a character in Better Call Saul

Business 
 Caldera (company), a US-based software company founded in 1994 to develop Linux- and DOS-based operating system products
 Caldera UK Ltd., a subsidiary of Caldera, Inc., and developers of DR-DOS between 1996 and 1999
 Caldera Deutschland GmbH, formerly LST GmbH, a Linux development center
 Caldera Thin Clients, Inc., later Lineo, a US-based subsidiary of Caldera, Inc. formed in 1998
 Caldera Systems, Inc., a US-based subsidiary of Caldera, Inc. formed in 1998 and releasing software including OpenLinux
 Caldera International, Inc., successor to Caldera Systems, Inc., later becoming the SCO Group
 Caldera K.K., a Japanese subsidiary of Caldera International, Inc. formed in 2001
 Caldera OpenLinux, the operating system released by Caldera Systems often called "Caldera"
 Caldera v. Microsoft, an antitrust lawsuit
 Caldera (France), an imaging software company founded in 1991 and unrelated to the US-based Caldera companies

Sports 
 Kona Caldera, a cross-country mountain bike frame
 Nike Caldera, a light-weight hiking boot

Science

Physics
 Caldera, a shallow potential well

See also 
 Caldara
 Candela (disambiguation)
 Antonio Caldara (1670–1736), Italian composer
 Lycinus caldera,  mygalomorph spider of Chile